Tanel Tein (born 10 January 1978) is an Estonian former professional basketball player. He was named Estonian Player of the Year in 2008. Tein played one season of college basketball for the St. Francis Terriers.

Professional career
Tein started his career playing for hometown team Tartu in 1993 and led them to two Estonian championships (2000, 2001) and three Estonian Cups (2000–2002). In July 2003, he signed with Śląsk Wrocław of the Polish Basketball League and the Euroleague, and won the Polish Cup in 2004. Tein subsequently played for Alba Berlin and Dynamo Moscow Region, before returning to University of Tartu in November 2005. He went on to win three more Estonian championships in 2007, 2008, 2010.

National team career
Tein began playing for the Estonian national basketball team in 1998. He played with Estonia at the EuroBasket 2001, averaging 5.3 points, 2.7 rebounds and 2.7 assists per game. The team finished the tournament with a 0–3 record for 14th place.

Controversy
On 11 June 2010, Tein attracted media attention after being brought down by rescuers from a pedestrian bridge in Tartu, where he had fallen asleep drunk.

Career statistics

Euroleague

|-
| style="text-align:left;"| 2003–04
| style="text-align:left;"| Śląsk Wrocław
| 14 || 14 || 29.9 || .413 || .315 || .875 || 2.9 || .8 || 1.2 || .1 || 8.1 || 7.9

College

|-
| style="text-align:left;"| 1998–99
| style="text-align:left;"| St. Francis (NY)
| 26|| ... || ... || .418 || .452 || .813 || 2.3 || 1.6 || .8 || .2 || 5.3

Awards and accomplishments
 5× Estonian League champion: 2000, 2001, 2007, 2008, 2010
 3× Estonian Cup winner: 2000, 2001, 2002
 Polish Cup winner: 2004
 Estonian Player of the Year: 2008
 3× Estonian League MVP: 2001, 2002, 2006
 Estonian League Play-offs MVP: 2000
 Estonian League Finals MVP: 2007
 4× All-Estonian League Team: 2001, 2006, 2008, 2008

References

External links
 Tanel Tein at basket.ee 
 Tanel Tein at euroleague.net
 Tanel Tein at fiba.com

1978 births
Living people
Sportspeople from Tartu
Shooting guards
Estonian men's basketball players
Korvpalli Meistriliiga players
Tartu Ülikool/Rock players
St. Francis Brooklyn Terriers men's basketball players
Śląsk Wrocław basketball players
Alba Berlin players
BC Zenit Saint Petersburg players
Estonian expatriate basketball people in the United States
Estonian expatriate basketball people in Poland
Estonian expatriate basketball people in Germany
Estonian expatriate basketball people in Russia